Christian Fuscarino (born ), is a community organizer, LGBT activist and the executive director of Garden State Equality. Since a young age Fuscarino has been involved in shaping public opinion and aiming to increase the rights for the LGBT community. In 2007, a public service announcement produced by Fuscarino won an Emmy award from the National Academy of Arts and Sciences for the way it approached the public perception of the LGBT community.

In 2008, he founded The Pride Network. Previously, he worked at the Hudson Pride Connections Center and in 2013, he joined Bend the Arc: A Jewish Partnership for Justice. He is also a frequent writer and contributor to The Huffington Post and NJ.com on LGBTQ related matters. He joined Garden State Equality in 2016. His work with the LGBT community led him to be recognized by PolitikerNJ and The New York Observer in their Power 100 list in 2016.

Early life
Fuscarino grew up in Belmar, New Jersey. After moving to Maplewood, New Jersey, he attended Columbia High School, where he started organizing at local high schools. He studied at Hofstra University.

Career
From a young age, Fuscarino has been an organizer and activist in the LGBT community. He began at GLSEN, an education network that aimed to improve students lives who were members of the LGBT community, by reducing discrimination and increasing knowledge through education. While at GLSEN, Fuscarino encouraged young LGBT students to start Gay–straight alliance's in their schools.

Fuscarino joined Hudson Pride Connections Center in 2007, based in New Jersey. He served as the program director for the center, helping the cities youth offering a number of LGBT-related services. His work during those years didn't go unnoticed, with Fuscarino winning an Emmy award. He was awarded by the National Academy of Television Arts and Sciences for a public service announcement that was created by Fuscarino's team at the center. His involvement at the Hudson Pride Connections Center, led him to establish The Pride Network in 2008. The network serves as a non-profit, providing leadership development.

After running The Pride Network for a number of months, Fuscarino joined the non-profit Bend the Arc in 2013 as their digital strategist. Bend the Arc at the time was headed up by Alan van Capelle, who had previously served as executive director of Empire State Pride Agenda. While working with Bend the Arc, he and van Capelle launched a campaign, which played a major role in the signing of the Domestic Worker's Bill of Rights in California.

In 2016, it was announced that Fuscarino would become Garden State Equality's new executive director. Following the announcement, he was interviewed by The New York Observer, stating what he wanted to achieve as the new executive director. He stated, “people all over the country are wondering what an organization in a post-marriage state looks like. They’ll find out in New Jersey,” Mr. Fuscarino told PolitickerNJ. “Over the next few months we’ll roll out our plan to engage the LGBT community in a broader social justice movement.” As director Fuscarino said that he wanted to tackle issues such as curbing HIV transmissions, protecting LGBT youth from opiate addiction, and care for the elderly. Senator Cory Booker and Congressman Frank Pallone both publicly voiced their support for Fuscarino following the appointment.

After becoming the executive director for Garden State Equality, the PolitickerNJ listed Fuscarino in their Power 100. He was also second highest LGBT New Jersey-based activist and politician on the list. In March 2017, Fuscarino spoke to the press following an attack on the Garden State Equality building where a window was smashed, where the rainbow flag was displayed. The attack, was similar to one carried out earlier in the same year at the Equality Florida headquarters. Vice Media's Broadly website listed Fuscarino as the most influential activist in the state of New Jersey.

See also
 Garden State Equality

References

American LGBT rights activists
LGBT people from New Jersey
Living people
Columbia High School (New Jersey) alumni
Hofstra University alumni
People from Belmar, New Jersey
People from Maplewood, New Jersey
Year of birth missing (living people)
21st-century LGBT people